Stonecrest may refer to:

Stonecrest (Bedford Corners, New York), listed on the National Register of Historic Places in Westchester County, New York
Stonecrest (Rhinebeck, New York), listed on the National Register of Historic Places in Dutchess County, New York
Stonecrest, Georgia, which incorporated as a city in 2017 after approval in a 2016 referendum